Derek Alan Rucker (born October 2, 1966) is an American-Australian former professional basketball player who starred in the Australian National Basketball League for 15 seasons.

Playing career 
Prior to the commencement of his professional career, Rucker attended and graduated from the exclusive University School in Hunting Valley, Ohio. He accepted a basketball scholarship to attend Davidson College and quickly established himself as a player and leader by starting from his freshman year onwards. Rucker led the Wildcats to the NCAA Tournament his sophomore season and finished at Davidson as the 3rd (now 4th) all-time leading scorer and all-time assists (now 5th) and steals leader (currently 1st). In addition to being first team All-Southern Conference three years in a row and the Southern Conference Tournament MVP, Rucker was also a two-time Academic All-American. Davidson College retired Rucker's #11 uniform and inducted Rucker into the Davidson Hall of Fame.

Rucker was one of the most dynamic and exciting players in the history of the NBL and won the league's coveted Most Valuable Player (MVP) award with the Brisbane Bullets in 1990.  Rucker began his career with Brisbane and played for the Newcastle Falcons, Townsville Suns and West Sydney Razorbacks before returning to the Bullets to finish his career.

Rucker finished his NBL career in the top ten all-time in several statistical categories: scoring (7th), assists (4th), steals (4th) and three-point field goals made (5th). He also finished in the top five in MVP voting four times in a six-year span. Rucker appeared in two championship series and was a two-time All-Star Game MVP. Rucker also played professionally in England and the Philippines.

Playing style 
Rucker played an aggressive, attacking offensive game using a combination of skilled moves with the ball. Rucker was a match-winning point guard who scored heavily while also amassing high assist totals throughout his career. An excellent athlete with superb quickness and excellent jumping ability, he constantly raided the keyway and rim despite his size of 184 cm (6'0") and 80 kg (176 lbs). Combined with outstanding long range shooting ability, Rucker was a very tough player to defend. It was Rucker's exciting style of play during the boom years of the NBL in Australia that thrust him into celebrity status in the new millennium.

Personal 
Rucker is the son of former NFL standout Reggie Rucker and Carole Gooch, and has two younger brothers. He and his former partner, Kim Skelton, have two children.

In 2016, he was charged with fraud for stealing $20,000 from the Gladstone Basketball Association.

Media work and post career 
Rucker worked for numerous media entities in Australia during and after his playing career including Fox Sports, Channel 9, Radio 2UE Sydney, B105FM Brisbane and Brisbane's Courier Mail. He co-hosted the national NBL weekly recap show in with Stephanie Brantz on Australia's Channel 9 network. After retiring, Rucker became the Sydney Kings' Executive Director of Corporate Basketball Services. He also appeared in the feature film Living Color.

Rucker later ran a high-end sports tour in the United States called D-Ruck's Dream USA Sports Getaway. The first tour was completed in September 2013.

On May 23, 2014, Rucker joined the Gladstone Port City Power of the Queensland Basketball League for a one-game stint. In just over 27 minutes of action, he recorded 5 points, 2 assists and 2 steals in a loss to the Mackay Meteors. In 2015, he was appointed the Gladstone Port City Power chairman and head coach of the men's team. In November 2015, he was appointed head coach of the Logan Thunder for the 2016 QBL season.

NBL career highlights 
 51 points in a game
 24 assists in a game – NBL Record
 Averaged 30+ points per game three times
 25 games of 40+ points
 10.6 assists per game – NBL Record
 2x Grand Finalist
 3x All-NBL first team
 2x All-Star Game MVP

References

External links 
 Eurobasket.com Profile
 NBL stats
 Razorbacks profile
 NBL profile

1966 births
Living people
American expatriate basketball people in Australia
American expatriate basketball people in El Salvador
American expatriate basketball people in the Philippines
American expatriate basketball people in the United Kingdom
Barangay Ginebra San Miguel players
Basketball players from Washington, D.C.
Birmingham Bullets players
Brisbane Bullets players
Davidson Wildcats men's basketball players
Newcastle Falcons (basketball) players
Point guards
Townsville Crocodiles players
West Sydney Razorbacks players
American men's basketball players
Philippine Basketball Association imports